Robert A. Zarnoch (born September 19, 1945) is an American lawyer and jurist. Since February 2008 he has been a judge of the Maryland Court of Special Appeals, Maryland's Intermediate Appellate Court.

Background

Born in Baltimore, Maryland, Judge Zarnoch graduated with a B.A. in English from Loyola College in Maryland in Baltimore in 1967 and from American University, M.A. in journalism in 1969. He received his J.D. from Georgetown University Law Center in 1974. While in law school he served as an editor on the Georgetown Law Review.  He served in the U.S. Army Reserve.

Legal career

Judge Zarnoch clerked for Chief Judge Robert C. Murphy, of the Maryland Court of Appeals from 1974 to 1975. He is a member of the Maryland Bar and the District of Columbia Bar. From 1977 to 2008, Judge Zarnoch served as an Assistant Attorney General in the Office of the Maryland Attorney General, first in the civil litigation division and then as Counsel to the Maryland General Assembly. In the latter capacity he advised members of the Maryland legislature on the legality and constitutionality of legislation and procedure. He served in the Office of the Attorney General under Attorneys General Stephen H. Sachs, J. Joseph Curran and Douglas F. Gansler.

Judge Zarnoch is an adjunct instructor at the University of Maryland School of Law and the University of Baltimore School of Law.

Awards

Zarnoch has also been the recipient of several awards:
Exceptional Career Service Award, Office of Attorney General, 2000
Maryland Leadership in Law Award, Daily Record, 2005

External links
Zarnoch's profile at Maryland's state archives

1945 births
Living people
Loyola University Maryland alumni
Georgetown University Law Center alumni
Maryland Court of Special Appeals judges